Bîmen Şen (born Bîmen Dergazaryan, Armenian Բիմէն Տէրկազարեան, in Bursa, Ottoman Empire) was a Turkish composer and lyricist of Armenian descent. He was born in 1873 and died in Istanbul, Turkey on 26 August 1943.

Life
Şen came from a music-loving family and was esteemed for his singing. As a child, Şen performed hymns in the Armenian church and quickly became well-known. At age eleven, while visiting Bursa, he was introduced to Hacı Ârif Bey. As an adult, Şen moved to Istanbul, and was able to improve his financial situation and establish connections with people in various circles. He studied with some of the most influential musical figures of the day, including Hacı Ârif Bey, Tanburî Cemil Bey, Neyzen Aziz Dede, Şevki Dede, Rahmi Bey, Hanende Nedim Bey, and Hacı Kirami Efendi. Şen eventually became a celebrated singer.

See also 
 List of composers of classical Turkish music

References

Composers of Ottoman classical music
Composers of Turkish makam music
1873 births
1943 deaths
People from Bursa
Composers from the Ottoman Empire